The Sisters of St. Joseph is a Roman Catholic congregation of women, founded in 1650. It may also refer to:

 Religious Hospitallers of St. Joseph, founded in La Flèche, France in 1636 by Jerome le Royer de la Dauversiere and Marie de la Ferre
 Sisters of St. Joseph of Cluny, founded 1807 in Cluny, France
 The Sisters of St. Joseph of Peace, founded in 1884 in Nottingham, England 
 Sisters of St Joseph of the Sacred Heart, founded in 1866 in South Australia
 Sisters of Saint Joseph of Saint-Marc, founded in 1845 in Alsace, France
 Sisters of St. Joseph of the Third Order of St. Francis, founded in 1901 in Wisconsin, United States
 Sisters of St. Joseph of the Apparition,  founded in 1832 in Gaillac, France